Varabei or Varabey is a surname. It is the Belarusian form of Vorobey. Notable people with the surname include:

 Maksim Varabei (born 1995), Belarusian biathlete
 Mikalai Varabei (born 1963), Belarusian businessman

Belarusian-language surnames